Dano Airport  is a public use airport located near Dano, Ioba, Burkina Faso.

See also
List of airports in Burkina Faso

References

External links 
 Airport record for Dano Airport at Landings.com

Airports in Burkina Faso
Ioba Province